Roberto Falaschi (9 June 1931 – 30 May 2009) was an Italian professional racing cyclist. He rode in five editions of the Tour de France.

References

External links
 

1931 births
2009 deaths
Italian male cyclists
Sportspeople from the Province of Pisa
Cyclists from Tuscany